The 2016 Korean Series was the championship series of the 2016 KBO League season. The Doosan Bears, as the regular season champions, automatically advanced to the Korean Series. They played against the winner of the playoff series, the NC Dinos, who defeated the LG Twins.

Doosan won the first four games of the best-of-seven series, winning their fifth Korean Series title.

Roster

Summary

Matchups

Game 1

Dustin Nippert started for Doosan and Zach Stewart started for the Dinos. Nippert did not allow a hit in his first six innings pitched. Doosan defeated the NC Dinos 1-0 in 11 innings in Game 1. Oh Jae-il hit the game-winning sacrifice fly for Doosan.

Game 2

Game 3

Game 4

See also
2016 KBO League season
2016 World Series
2016 Japan Series

References

Korean Series
Doosan Bears
NC Dinos
Korean Series
Korean Series
Korean Series
Korean Series